Lotion is a 1994 extended play by the band of the same name released through Big Cat Records.

Track listing
All songs composed by Lotion, except where noted
"Around" – 6:04
"Juggernaut" – 3:07
"Gardening Your Wig" (Bill Berry, Peter Buck, Mike Mills, Bob Mould, and Michael Stipe) – 4:32
"Treat Me" – 6:18

Personnel
Lotion
Bill Ferguson – bass guitar
Jim Ferguson – guitar
Rob Youngberg – drums
Tony Zajkowski – vocals

1994 EPs
Lotion (band) albums